

X

References

Lists of words